The 2004 Texas A&M Aggies football team completed the season with a 7–5 record.  The Aggies had a regular season Big 12 record of 5–3.

Schedule

Game summaries

Utah

Wyoming

Clemson

Kansas State

Iowa State

Oklahoma State

Colorado

Baylor

Oklahoma

Texas Tech

Texas

Tennessee (Cotton Bowl Classic)

References

Texas AandM
Texas A&M Aggies football seasons
Texas AandM Aggies football